New Ellerby is a hamlet in the East Riding of Yorkshire, England, in an area known as Holderness.

Together with its neighbour, Old Ellerby, it forms the civil parish of Ellerby.

In 1823, Edward Baines indicates Ellerby was in the civil parish of Swine, and the Wapentake and Liberty of Holderness. The population at the time, including the then settlements of Dowthorp, Langthorp and Owbrough, was 233, including five farmers, a blacksmith, a wheelwright, a shoemaker, the landlord of The Board public house, and a further farmer at Dowthorp.
 
New Ellerby was served from 1864 to 1964 by Burton Constable railway station on the Hull and Hornsea Railway.

References

Villages in the East Riding of Yorkshire
Holderness